Rolf Haller (born 9 August 1957) is a German former racing cyclist. He rode in the 1980 Tour de France.

References

External links
 

1957 births
Living people
German male cyclists
Place of birth missing (living people)
Cyclists from Bavaria
People from Dillingen (district)
Sportspeople from Swabia (Bavaria)